The 2019 Niger State gubernatorial election occurred on March 9, 2019, in Nigeria. The APC nominee Abubakar Sani Bello won the election, defeating Umar Nasko of the PDP.

Abubakar Sani Bello emerged APC gubernatorial candidate after he was returned as the sole candidate. He retained his deputy Ahmed Muhammad Ketso as his running mate. Umar Nasko was the PDP candidate with Mohammed Ndayako as his running mate. 31 candidates contested in the election.

Electoral system
The Governor of Nasarawa is elected using the plurality voting system.

Primary election

APC primary
The APC primary election was held on September 30, 2018. Abubakar Sani Bello won the primary election after he was returned as the sole candidate. He picked his deputy Ahmed Muhammad Ketso as his running mate.

PDP primary
The PDP primary election was held on September 30, 2018. Umar Nasko won the primary election polling 1,972 votes against 4 other candidates. His closest rival was Ahmed Musa Ibeto, a former envoy to South Africa, who came second with 516 votes, Mu’azu Hannafi Sudan came third with 157 votes.

Candidates
Party nominee: Umar Nasko: former commissioner
Running mate: Mohammed Ndayako: former member State House of Assembly
Ahmed Musa Ibeto
Mu’azu Hannafi Sudan
Umar Ahmed

Results
A total number of 31 candidates registered with the Independent National Electoral Commission to contest in the election.

The total number of registered voters in the state was 2,377,034, while 925,518 voters were accredited. Total number of votes cast was 920,480, while number of valid votes was 900,871. Rejected votes were 19,609.

By local government area
Here are the results of the election by local government area for the two major parties. The total valid votes of 900,871 represents the 31 political parties that participated in the election. Blue represents LGAs won by Abubakar Sani Bello. Green represents LGAs won by Umar Nasko.

References 

Niger State gubernatorial election
Niger State gubernatorial election
Niger State gubernatorial elections
2019 Niger State elections